Deogracias Asuncion (born May 1, 1956) is a Filipino former cyclist. Competing in the sprint and points race events at the 1984 Summer Olympics, Asuncion was the only Filipino cyclist to compete in more than one event for that edition of the games.

Asuncion was also among five cyclists competing for the Philippines at the 1982 Asian Games in New Delhi. With three other teammates, he won a bronze medal in the 4,000 meter team pursuit event.

References

External links
 

1956 births
Living people
Filipino male cyclists
Olympic cyclists of the Philippines
Cyclists at the 1984 Summer Olympics
Place of birth missing (living people)
Asian Games medalists in cycling
Cyclists at the 1982 Asian Games
Asian Games bronze medalists for the Philippines
Medalists at the 1982 Asian Games